The 2019–20 Persian Gulf Pro League (formerly known as Iran Pro League) was the 37th season of Iran's Football League and 19th as Persian Gulf Pro League since its establishment in 2001. Persepolis are the defending champions and won their record-extending 4th consecutive title and 13th title overall (6th in the Pro League era) on 24 July with four games to spare. The season featured 14 teams from the 2018–19 Persian Gulf Pro League and two new teams promoted from the 2018–19 Azadegan League: Shahin Bushehr and Gol Gohar Sirjan.

Effects of the 2019–20 coronavirus pandemic 
Due to the ongoing COVID-19 pandemic in Iran, the Persian Gulf Pro League temporally suspended all matches from 11 March to 24 June 2020.

Teams

Stadia and locations

Number of teams by region

Personnel and kits

Note: Flags indicate national team as has been defined under FIFA eligibility rules. Players may hold more than one non-FIFA nationality.

Managerial changes

1.  Cusin became the official co-manager because Sarasiaei did not have AFC A-Licence.

Foreign players

The number of foreign players is restricted to four per Persian Gulf Pro League team, including a slot for a player from AFC countries. A team can use four foreign players on the field in each game, including at least one player from the AFC country. 
In bold: Players that have been capped for their national team.

League table

Results

Positions by round

Clubs season-progress

Season statistics

Top scorers

Hat-tricks

Top assists

Clean Sheets

Scoring

Attendances

Average home attendances

Attendances by round

Notes:Updated to games played on 23 February 2020. Source:   Matches with spectator bans are not included in average attendances  A=Away  N=Spectator Ban  C=No spectator due to CoronaVirus prevention  X=Not played

Highest attendances

Notes:Updated to games played on 7 February 2020. Source:

See also 
 2019–20 Azadegan League
 2019–20 League 2
 2019–20 League 3
 2019–20 Hazfi Cup
 2019 Iranian Super Cup
 2020 AFC Champions League

References 

Iran Pro League seasons
1
Iran
PGL